Mastacideidae is a family of grasshoppers in the order Orthoptera. There are at least two genera and about eight described species in Mastacideidae, found in South Asia.

Genera
These two genera belong to the family Mastacideidae:
 Mastacides Bolívar, 1899
 Paramastacides Descamps, 1974

References

Further reading

 
 

Caelifera